The Massachusetts Superior Court (also known as the Superior Court Department of the Trial Court) is a trial court department in Massachusetts.

The Superior Court has original jurisdiction in civil actions over $50,000, and in matters where equitable relief is sought. It also has original jurisdiction in actions involving labor disputes where injunctive relief is sought, and has exclusive authority to convene medical malpractice tribunals. 

The Business Litigation Sessions (BLS) of the Superior Court is a specialized Business Court docket located in Suffolk County (Boston). The BLS has jurisdiction over complex business and commercial disputes. The original Business Litigation Session solely heard cases arising in Suffolk County, beginning in 2000, but over time the BLS became a regional program and finally a statewide business court.   

The Court has exclusive original jurisdiction in first degree murder cases and original jurisdiction for all other crimes. It has jurisdiction over all felony matters, although it shares jurisdiction over crimes where other Trial Court Departments have concurrent jurisdiction. Finally, the Superior Court has appellate jurisdiction over certain administrative proceedings.

References

External links
Official website

Superior Court, Massachusetts
Superior Court
Government of Massachusetts
Massachusetts